Roseville Presbyterian Church, also known as Roseville United Presbyterian Church, is a church at Roseville & Sussex Avenues in Newark, New Jersey, United States. It was organized and dedicated in 1854 and its current Sanctuary was built in 1867.

History  

The church began in 1852 as Sunday school classes, held at North 7th & Orange Streets, in "Rowe's Village", present day neighborhood of Roseville. In 1853, Aaron Peck, who owned most of present-day Roseville, donated the land on Roseville Avenue, where a small frame church was erected.

On April 9, 1854, Roseville Presbyterian Church was incorporated by the Newark Presbytery and on April 27, Dr. John F Pingry was installed as the first pastor.

In 1867, the center portion of the present sanctuary was built. Designed by Frank F. Ward of Ward & Davis, It was enlarged with wings on either side in 1875. After using the original frame building as a Sunday school house, it was removed and the present red brick building, known as the "Education building" was erected.

In 1907, the building which would eventually house the chapel (and later renovated to house offices and a conference room), was built adjacent to the Education building and connected to the Sanctuary.

In 1913, the Manse was built directly on the corner of Sussex & Roseville Avenues and the kitchen was added to the Education building.

In 1924, Fewsmith Memorial Church at 34 Hudson St merged its 168 members into the congregation.

At the death of Ms. Edith Peck in 1935, the church was bequeathed the homestead of Cyrus Peck. The Peck family were longtime members and benefactors to the church.

Sherrill Hall, the last of the major buildings added to the campus, was completed in 1954 along with a new steeple after a fire destroyed the original.

Pastors 
Roseville has been served by 11 pastors.

 1854 - 1860:     Dr. John F. Pingry
 Resigned to establish The Pingry School.
 1860 - 1903:     Dr. Charles T. Haley
 1905 - 1924:     Dr. William Young Chapman
 Resigned to become President of Bloomfield College & Seminary
 1924 - 1956:     Dr. Walter L. Wallon
 1957 - 1964:     Rev. Leonard Evans
 1965 - 1972:     Rev. Kenneth Blaine Cragg
 1973 - 1976:     Rev. Howard Bryant
 1978 - 1987:     Rev. Oliver Brown II
 1992 - 1994:     Rev. Marvin Williams
 1997 - 2015:     Rev. Doris Glaspy
 2021 – present: Rev. Toure C. Marshall

Interim pastors 
 1956 - 1956: Dr. Henry Strock
 1972 - 1973: Dale Tremper
 2016 - 2021: Rev. Danny Mitchell

References 

Churches in Newark, New Jersey